The Festival Cinema e Ambiente Avezzano is an annual film festival held in Avezzano, in the Abruzzo region, Italy. The festival boasts the recognition of the Ministry of Culture.

The festival 
The festival Cinema e Ambiente follows the story of Avezzano film festivals and since 2016 it has become an international kermesse dedicated to environmentalist feature films, shorts and documentaries. 
The aim of the festival is to raise awareness and understanding of environmental issues and related film productions from all continents. Lasting five days, it generally takes place in the first week of June in different locations such as the Mazzini arena in the center of Avezzano, the Orsini-Colonna Castle, the Monte Salviano guided nature reserve and the Roman amphitheater of Alba Fucens.

The festival has four sections:

 international competition for fictional or documentary feature films;
 international competition for fictional or documentary short films;
 international competition for projects reserved for underage students;
 international competition for short screenplays.

References

External links 
 

Film festivals in Italy
June events
Annual events in Italy
Italian film awards
Film festivals established in 2016
Avezzano